Change4Life is a public health programme in England which began in January 2009, run by Public Health England. It is the country's first national social marketing campaign to tackle the causes of obesity.

Change4Life aims to help families make small, sustainable yet significant improvements to their diet and activity levels. It uses the slogan "more kids, less food, eat less, move more, live longer".

Change4Life encourages families to adopt seven healthy behaviours:
5 A Day – suggestions for ways to eat the recommended 5 portions of fruit and veg each day
400, 600, 600 - advice on watching calorie intake at breakfast (400 calories), lunch, and dinner (600 calories each)
Watch the salt – advice on reducing the amount of salt eaten each day, ideally keeping it to below 6g for adults
Cut back fat – information about the (mainly saturated) fat found in foods and ways to reduce this
Sugar swaps – information about sugar found in foods and suggestions for healthier alternatives
100 Calorie Snacks, 2 A Day Max
Get going every day – the importance of leading an active lifestyle and ways for adults and children to do this cheaply and easily

Marketing approach
Change4Life adopts an integrated marketing approach and uses a variety of marketing channels including television and radio, digital, social media, PR and direct marketing. It uses animated television advertising by Aardman Animations, as part of a wider campaign. M&C Saatchi lead on the creative aspects of the campaign with additional input from a range of other agencies providing PR, digital, planning and data services.

Advertising

On Channel 4, Change4Life was a previous sponsor of The Simpsons.The sponsor of Change4Life with Simpsons happened from Monday, 5 October to Christmas Day 2009.

Change4Life also made a TV advert in 2019

Local supporters
In addition to consumer marketing, Change4Life engages with intermediaries at a local level, including schools, NHS organisations, local authorities and others. These local supporters are able to interact with the campaign audience in different ways and in different contexts to Change4Life's central approach. Free resources including posters and leaflets are available to local supporters to enable them to do this effectively. .

Change4Life Sports Clubs
Change4Life Sports Clubs were designed by Change4Life in 2011 to increase physical activity levels in less active children in primary and secondary schools by: 
Using multi-sport themes (primary) or alternative school sports (secondary)
Using the inspiration of the Olympic and Paralympic Games (which were held in 2012)
Responding to what children want
Establishing a habit of regular participation
Developing a real sense of belonging
Changing behaviours relating to key health outcomes (including healthy eating, physical activity and emotional health)

The Change4Life Sports Clubs programme is funded by the Department of Health and managed by the Youth Sport Trust.

Start4Life
Start4Life is a sister brand of Change4Life. It is aimed primarily at pregnant women and new mothers. It encourages a healthy lifestyle during pregnancy (activity, healthy eating, taking supplements, quitting smoking, and avoiding alcohol) as well as a healthy start for new babies (breastfeeding, introducing solid foods, avoiding sugary foods, and activity).

It also encourages fathers, friends and family members to support pregnant women and new mothers in making healthy lifestyle choices. Free leaflets and posters are available to healthcare professionals to help them encourage their patients to make healthy lifestyle choices.

See also 
 Obesity in the United Kingdom

References

External links 

 

Health education in the United Kingdom
Health campaigns
2009 establishments in England
Obesity in the United Kingdom